Healthscope is a for-profit Australian company which operates private hospitals, medical centres and rehabilitation hospitals. The company is headquartered on St Kilda Road, Melbourne. It operates medical/surgical hospitals and a number of psychiatric and rehabilitation hospital clinics.

History
Healthscope is a private healthcare provider in Australia with 41 hospitals.

Formed in 1985, the Healthscope Group has a long history in the private health care industry, and was initially listed on the Australian Securities Exchange (ASX) in 1994.

In October 2010 the Healthscope business was acquired by a consortium of funds, advised and managed by TPG Capital and The Carlyle Group and was subsequently de-listed from the ASX. Following a period of successful growth under private ownership, the Healthscope business was re-listed on the ASX on 28 July 2014.

In July 2015 Healthscope sold its Australian Pathology division to Crescent Capital Partners.

In August 2017, Healthscope sold their Medical Centres portfolio to Singapore-based Fullerton Healthcare.

On 6 June 2019, Canadian firm Brookfield Business Partners LLP announced completion of its takeover of Healthscope. Brookfield partnered with institutional investors including the Caisse de dépôt et placement du Québec, and the CDPQ maintains a minority stake in Healthscope.

Hospitals and facilities run by Healthscope

Hospitals
Healthscope operates and manages 41 private hospitals in Australia, which includes twelve mental health facilities, and six rehabilitation hospitals as well as managing 15 residential care houses through Healthscope Independence Services.
Queensland
Brisbane Private Hospital
Gold Coast Private Hospital (previously Allamanda Private Hospital)
Pacific Private Hospital
Peninsula Private Hospital
Pine Rivers Private Hospital
Sunnybank Private Hospital
New South Wales
Campbelltown Private Hospital
Lady Davidson Private Hospital
Hunter Valley Private Hospital
Nepean Private Hospital
Newcastle Private Hospital
Northern Beaches Hospital
Norwest Private Hospital
Prince of Wales Private Hospital
Sydney Southwest Private Hospital
The Hills Private Hospital
The Sydney Clinic
Tweed Day Surgery
Australian Capital Territory
National Capital Private Hospital
Victoria
Bellbird Private Hospital
Dorset Rehabilitation Centre
Frankston Private Hospital
Geelong Private Hospital. Closed: site reverted to Barwon Health
Holmesglen Private Hospital
John Fawkner Private Hospital
Knox Private Hospital
La Trobe Private Hospital
Melbourne Private Hospital
North Eastern Rehabilitation Centre
Northpark Private Hospital
Ringwood Private Hospital
The Geelong Clinic
The Melbourne Clinic
The Victoria Clinic
The Victorian Rehabilitation Centre
Tasmania
Hobart Private Hospital
St Helen's Private Hospital (Mental Health facility)
South Australia
Adelaide Community Healthcare Alliance
Ashford Hospital
Flinders Private Hospital
The Memorial Hospital
Griffith Rehabilitation Hospital
 Parkwynd Private Hospital. Closed in April 2021 
Western Australia
Mount Hospital
Northern Territory
Darwin Private Hospital

Mental Health Services
Healthscope Hospitals is the largest operator of private inpatient mental health facilities in Australia with 12 hospitals providing care. 
Healthscope Hospitals provide treatment for mental health issues and for substance use disorders.

Healthscope Hospitals offering Mental Health Services

 Brisbane Private Hospital (Brisbane, Qld)
 Campbelltown Private Hospital (Campbelltown, NSW)
 Northpark Private Hospital (Bundoora, Vic)
 Pine Rivers Private Hospital (Strathpine, Qld)
 St Helen's Private Hospital (Hobart)
 Sydney Southwest Private Hospital (Liverpool, NSW)
 The Geelong Clinic (Geelong, Vic)
 The Hills Private Hospital (Baulkham Hills, NSW)
 The Melbourne Clinic (Richmond, Vic)
 The Sydney Clinic (Randwick, NSW)
 The Victoria Clinic (Prahran, Vic)
 The Darwin Clinic (Darwin, NT) 

The programs available at Healthscope Hospitals include:
 Mood & Anxiety Disorders
 Eating Disorders
 Addiction Services 
 Post Traumatic Stress Disorder (PTSD)
 Personality Disorders
 Aged Psychiatry
 Psychosis Obsessive Compulsive Disorder (OCD)
 Postnatal Depression 
 Innovative Treatments for Depression (TMS)

Rehabilitation Services
Healthscope Hospitals offering Rehabilitation Services
 Brisbane Private Hospital (Brisbane, Qld)
 Campbelltown Private Hospital (Campbelltown, NSW)
 Darwin Private Hospital (Darwin, NT)
 Dorset Rehabilitation Centre (Pascoe Vale, Vic)
 Geelong Private Hospital (Geelong, Vic)
 Griffith Rehabilitation Hospital (Hove, SA)
 Gold Coast Private Hospital (Southport, Qld)
 Hobart Private Hospital (Hobart, Tas)
 Hunter Valley Private Hospital (Newcastle, NSW)
 Lady Davidson Private Hospital (North Turramurra, NSW)
 Mount Hospital (Perth, WA)
 National Capital Private Hospital (Canberra, ACT)
 Newcastle Private Hospital (Newcastle, NSW)
 North Eastern Rehabilitation Centre (Ivanhoe, Vic)
 Peninsula Private Hospital (Kippa-Ring, Qld)
 Sunnybank Private Hospital (Sunnybank, Qld)
 The Hills Private Hospital (Baulkham Hills, NSW)
 The Victorian Rehabilitation Centre (Glen Waverley, Vic)

Healthscope Pathology
In July 2015 Healthscope sold its Australian Pathology business to Crescent Capital Partners. Healthscope sold its New Zealand pathology business in August 2020 to NZ Super.

Healthscope Medical Centres
In August 2017, Healthscope sold their Medical Centres division including a portfolio of 43 medical centres, four specialist skin clinics and one specialist breast diagnostic clinic to Fullerton Health Care.

Healthscope Independence Services
Healthscope Independence Services is a provider of unique accommodation, attendant care and in-home services to individuals with acquired brain injuries, other disabilities or complex conditions and others leaving hospital requiring extra support at home.
Healthscope Independence Services provides long-term, short-term, transitional and respite options in metropolitan Melbourne, regional Victoria, New South Wales and Darwin in the Northern Territory.

Ownership
Healthscope was a public company whose stock was traded on the Australian Stock Exchange under the stock code HSP. The company completed an initial public offering in 1994 when it raised A$70 million by issuing 40 million shares at A$1.75 each. In 2010, Healthscope was acquired by The Carlyle Group. It was managed by TPG and The Carlyle Group and was later re-added to the ASX on 28 July 2014. From July 2014, Healthscope stock was again part of the S&P/ASX 200 Index under the stock code HSO. As at June 2019, Healthscope was removed from the official list of ASX traded companies as they were acquired by Brookfield.

References

External links
 
 The web site for the Gribbles Group
 The Healthscope Story
 Healthscope Culture and People

Brookfield Asset Management
Companies based in Melbourne
Companies formerly listed on the Australian Securities Exchange
Health services companies of Australia
1985 establishments in Australia
Caisse de dépôt et placement du Québec companies